Valerie Peat (30 April 1947 – 14 May 1997) was a British international sprinter.

Athletics career
She competed in the women's 100 metres at the 1968 Summer Olympics.

She represented England and won a silver medal in the 4 x 100 metres relay, at the 1970 British Commonwealth Games in Edinburgh, Scotland.

References

External links
 

1947 births
1997 deaths
Athletes (track and field) at the 1968 Summer Olympics
British female sprinters
Olympic athletes of Great Britain
Athletes (track and field) at the 1970 British Commonwealth Games
Commonwealth Games medallists in athletics
Commonwealth Games silver medallists for England
Place of birth missing
Olympic female sprinters
20th-century British women
Medallists at the 1970 British Commonwealth Games